Desești is a commune in Maramureș County, Maramureș, Romania. It is composed of three villages: Desești, Hărnicești (Hernécs) and Mara (Crăcești until 1956; Krácsfalva).

The commune's Saint Parascheva Church was built in 1770 and is one of eight Wooden Churches of Maramureș that are listed by UNESCO as a World Heritage Site.

References

Communes in Maramureș County
Localities in Romanian Maramureș